Bout-du-Pont-de-Larn is a commune in the Tarn department in southern France.

Geography
The Thoré forms the commune's southern border. The Arn, a tributary of the Thoré, forms its northern border.

See also
Communes of the Tarn department

References

Communes of Tarn (department)